Tracey Ivan Moore (16 December 1941 – January 2018) was an English cricketer who played for Norfolk County Cricket Club. Moore played for Norfolk 169 times in the Minor Counties Championship and is the second highest wicket-taker in the county's history with 474 wickets taken. He also played for Minor Counties North and Minor Counties East.

Cricket career
Moore was born in Ingham, Norfolk in 1941 and educated at Stalham High School. He made his cricket debut for Norfolk as a teenager in 1959 and played for the county in the Minor Counties Championship  each season until 1978. He captained Norfolk in the Championship, becoming the first state educated player to do so. He bowled fast-medium pace and was described as having "good line and length" and as "a strong man who could hit the pitch hard". He took five or more wickets in an innings 17 times in the Championship and returned best bowling figures of eight wickets for 71 runs against Hertfordshire. His 474 Championship wickets for Norfolk is second only to Michael Falcon and were taken at an average of 25.28.

Moore played four matches for Norfolk in the Gillette Cup between 1965 and 1969, making his List A cricket debut against Hampshire at County Ground, Southampton in the 1965 competition. He took six wickets against Yorkshire County Cricket Club in the competition in 1968, the best bowling figures for Norfolk in a List A match. Between 1972 and 1976 he played for Minor Counties North and Minor Counties East representative sides in the Benson & Hedges Cup making a total of 13 List A appearances. In local cricket he played for Ingham Cricket Club for 40 years.

Later life
Away from cricket Moore worked as a sales representative for companies such as Waveney Fork Trucks in Norfolk. On 23 January 2018 it was announced that he died at the age of 76 after a battle with cancer.

References

External links

1941 births
2018 deaths
Place of birth missing
Norfolk cricketers
Minor Counties cricketers
People from North Norfolk (district)
Deaths from cancer in England